Community psychology is concerned with the community as the unit of study. This contrasts with most psychology which focuses on the individual. Community psychology also studies the community as a context for the individuals within it, and the relationships of the individual to communities and society. Community psychologists seek to understand the functioning of the community, including the quality of life of persons within groups, organizations and institutions, communities, and society. Their aim is to enhance quality of life through collaborative research and action.

Community psychology employs various perspectives within and outside psychology to address issues of communities, the relationships within them, and related people's attitudes and behaviour.

Rappaport (1977) discusses the perspective of community psychology as an ecological perspective on the person–environment fit (this is often related to work environments) being the focus of study and action instead of attempting to change the personality of individual or the environment when an individual is seen as having a problem.

Closely related disciplines include community practice, ecological psychology, environmental psychology, critical psychology, cross-cultural psychology, social psychology,  political science, public health, sociology, social work, applied anthropology, and community development.

In the United States, community psychology grew out of the community mental health movement, but evolved dramatically as early practitioners incorporated their understandings of political structures and other community contexts into perspectives on client services.  However, in other regions, it has had different origins.  In much of Latin America, for example, it developed from social psychology, as a response to the "crisis of social psychology" and the search for psychological theory and practice relevant to the social problems of the region.

Society for Community Research and Action 

Division 27 of the American Psychological Association is the community psychology division of the APA, called the Society for Community Research and Action (SCRA). The Society's mission is as follows:

The SCRA website has resources for teaching and learning community psychology, information on events in the field and related to research and action, how to become involved and additional information on the field, members and undergraduate and graduate programs in community psychology.

History of community psychology in the US
In the 1950s and 1960s, many factors contributed to the beginning of community psychology in the US. Some of these factors include:
 A shift away from socially conservative, individual-focused practices in health care and psychology into a progressive period concerned with issues of public health, prevention and social change after World War II and social psychologists' growing interest in racial and religious prejudice, poverty, and other social issues 
 The perceived need of larger-scale mental illness treatment for veterans
 Psychologists questioning the value of psychotherapy alone in treating large numbers of people with mental illness
 The development of community mental health centers and de-institutionalization of people with mental illnesses into their communities

Swampscott Conference
In 1965, several psychologists met to discuss the future of community mental health as well as discuss the issue of only being involved with problems of mental health instead of the community as a whole. The Swampscott Conference is considered the birthplace of community psychology. A published report on the conference calls for community psychologists to be political activists, agents of social change and "participant-conceptualizers."

Theories, concepts and values in community psychology

Ecological levels of analysis
James Kelly (1966; Trickett, 1984) developed an ecological analogy used to understand the ways in which settings and individuals are interrelated. Unlike the ecological framework developed by Bronfenbrenner (1979), the focus of Kelly's framework was not so much on how different levels of the environment may impact on the individual, but on understanding how human communities function. Specifically, Kelly suggests that there are 4 important principles that govern people in settings:  
 adaptation: i.e. that what individuals do is adaptive given the demands of the surrounding context. It is a two-way process: Individuals adapt to the restrictions, constraints, and quality of the environment, while the environment adapts to its members 
Examples: In regards to adaption of the individual, take for instance when an individual adapts to the demands of a new job, they adapt to that environment by learning or acquiring any necessary skills that they may need to perform their tasks well. On the environmental side of adaption, we can imagine various situations involving the family, such as the birth of a child, new job of a parent, or when children attend college and move away from home; in all of these instances the environment adapted as necessary to the changes in its members  
 succession: every setting has a history that created current structures, norms, attitudes, and policies, and any intervention in the setting must appreciate this history and understand why the current system exists in the form that it does. This principle applies to families, organizations, and communities; further, an implication of noting and understanding succession in these units is that psychologists must understand the history of that unit (family, organization, or community) before attempting to implement an intervention plan  
 cycling of resources: each setting has resources that need to be identified and possibilities for new resources to be developed; a resource perspective emphasizes a focus on strengths of individuals, groups, and institutions within the setting and interventions are more likely to succeed if they build on such existing strengths, rather than introduce new external mechanisms for change. There are personal resources which include individual talents, strengths, or specialties, as well as social resources such as shared norms, beliefs, or values; further, aspects of the physical environment can be considered resources, such as calm resting places, a library, and other qualities of the space in particular  
 interdependence: settings are systems, and any change to one aspect of the setting will have consequences for other aspects of the setting, so any intervention needs to anticipate its impact across the entire setting, and be prepared for unintended consequences. When we look at a school, for instance, as a real-world example, the interdependent parts include: students, teachers, administrators, students' parents, faculty and staff (secretaries, janitors, counselors, nurses), board members, and taxpayers

First-order and second-order change

Because community psychologists often work on social issues, they are often working toward positive social change. Watzlawick, et al. (1974) differentiated between first-order and second-order change and how second-order change is often the focus of community psychology.
 first-order change: positively changing the individuals in a setting to attempt to fix a problem
 second-order change: Attending to systems and structures involved with the problem to adjust the person–environment fit

As an example of how these methods differ, consider homelessness. A first-order change to "fix" homelessness would be to offer shelter to one or many homeless people. A second-order change would be to address issues in policy regarding affordable housing.

Prevention and health promotion
Community psychology emphasizes principles and strategies of preventing social, emotional and behavioral problems and wellness and health promotion at the individual and community levels, borrowed from Public health and Preventive medicine, rather than a passive, "waiting-mode," treatment-based medical model. Universal, selective, primary, and indicated or secondary prevention (early identification and intervention) are particularly emphasized. Community psychology's contributions to prevention science have been substantial, including development and evaluation of the Head Start Program.

Empowerment
One of the goals of community psychology involves empowerment of individuals and communities that have been marginalized by society.

One definition for the term is "an intentional, ongoing process centered in the local community, involving mutual respect, critical reflection, caring, and group participation, through which people lacking an equal share of resources gain greater access to and control over those resources" (Cornell Empowerment Group).

Rappaport's (1984) definition includes: "Empowerment is viewed as a process: the mechanism by which people, organizations, and communities gain mastery over their lives."

While empowerment has had an important place in community psychology research and literature, some have criticized its use. Riger (1993), for example, points to the paradoxical nature of empowerment being a masculine, individualistic construct being used in community research. Community psychologist Guy Holmes critiqued empowerment as a vague concept replete with what Wolf Wolfensberger has called 'high craze value' i.e. a fashionable term that means different things to different people, and ultimately means everything and nothing. Certainly few community psychologists would agree with Mao that 'power grows out of the barrel of a gun.'

In the 1990s, the support and empowerment paradigm (Racino, 1992) was proposed as an organizing concept to replace or complement the prior rehabilitation paradigm, and to acknowledge the diverse groups and community-based work of the emerging community disciplines.

Social justice
A core value of community psychology is seeking social justice through research and action. Community psychologists are often advocates for equality and policies that allow for the wellbeing of all people, particularly marginalized populations. For example, in May 2019 in the City of Brighton and Hove - Unframed Lives was an event about homelessness and austerity.

Diversity
Another value of community psychology involves embracing diversity. Rappaport includes diversity as a defining aspect of the field, calling research to be done for the benefit of diverse populations in gaining equality and justice. This value is seen through much of the research done with communities regardless of ethnicity, culture, sexual orientation, disability status, socioeconomic status, gender, and age.

Individual wellness
Individual wellness is the physical and psychological wellbeing of all people. Research in community psychology focuses on methods to increase individual wellness, particularly through prevention and second-order change.

Citizen participation
Citizen participation refers to the ability of individuals to have a voice in decision-making, defining and addressing problems, and the dissemination of information gathered on them. This is the basis for the usage of participatory action research in community psychology, where community members are often involved in the research process by sharing their unique knowledge and experience with the research team and working as co-researchers. In contrast, citizen participation is sought by community developers and community planners (i.e., public administrators) to assure that governmental funds best meet the needs of local citizenry. Three key values of participation are: building support for governmental planning, raising political consciousness, and furthering democratic values. Citizen participation in policymaking has a long history and has been particular strong in neighborhood action and poverty programs, and other activist-led initiatives.

Collaboration and community strengths
Collaboration with community members to construct research and action projects makes community psychology an exceptionally applied field. By allowing communities to use their knowledge to contribute to projects in a collaborative, fair and equal manner, the process of research can itself be empowering to citizens. This requires an ongoing relationship between the researcher and the community from before the research begins to after the research is over.

Psychological sense of community
Psychological sense of community (or simply "sense of community"), was introduced in 1974 by Seymour Sarason. In 1986 a major step was taken by David McMillan and David Chavis with the publication of their "Theory of Sense of Community" and in 1990 the "Sense of Community Index". Originally designed primarily in reference to neighborhoods, the Sense of Community Index (SCI) can be adapted to study other communities as well, including the workplace, schools, religious communities, communities of interest, etc.

Empirical grounding
Community psychology grounds all advocacy and social justice action in empiricism. This empirical grounding is what separates community psychology from a social movement or grassroots organization. Methods from psychology have been adapted for use in the field that acknowledge value-driven, subjective research involving community members. The methods used in community psychology are therefore tailored to each individual research question. Quantitative as well as qualitative methods and other innovative methods are embraced.

The American psychological Association has sponsored two major conferences on community research methods and has recently published an edited book on this topic.

Comparison of community and clinical psychology in the UK 
Community psychology has been differentiated from traditional clinical psychology as practiced in the UK in the following ways:

Examples of community psychology in the UK have been documented by Carolyn Kagan and Mark Burton, Jim Orford and Guy Holmes.

Education
Many programs related to community psychology are housed in psychology departments, while others are interdisciplinary. Students earning a community psychology degree complete courses that focus on: history and concepts of the field, human diversity and cultural competence, public health, community research methods and statistics, collaborative work in communities, organizational and community development and consultation, prevention and intervention, program evaluation, and grantwriting.

Research is a large component of both the PhD and master's degrees, as community psychologists base interventions on theory and research and use action-oriented research to promote positive change. Further, students will generally find niches under faculty mentors at their institutions related to local programs, organizations, grants, special populations, or social issues of interest—granting students the chance to have practice doing the work of a community psychologist, under the supervision of a faculty member.

Many community psychologists will find clinical psychologists involved in their work in communities, and collaboration between academic departments are encouraged.

To disseminate the field and make community psychology education free, an online Introduction to Community Psychology textbook was published in June 2019.

Peer-reviewed journals
The following journals provide peer-reviewed articles related to community psychology:
 American Journal of Community Psychology (Society for Community Research and Action (SCRA) journal)
 The Australian Community Psychologist (Journal of the Australian Psychological Society)
 Journal of Community & Applied Social Psychology (international journal)
 Journal of Community Psychology (international journal)
 Journal of Rural Community Psychology (e-journal)
  Psychosocial Intervention/Intervención Psicosocial (published in both Spanish and English)
  Rivista di Psicologia di Comunità (Italian journal)
  Global Journal of Community Psychology Practice (GJCCP)

In addition, there are a number of interdisciplinary journals, such as the Community Mental Health Journal, with articles in the field of community health that deal with aspects of community psychology.

See also

 Asset-based community development
 Behavior settings
 Community organizing
 Cultural-historical activity theory
 Ethnography
 Grounded theory
 Group dynamics
 Institution
 Large-group capacitation
 Multilevel model
 Photovoice
 Program evaluation
 Psychotherapy and social action model
 Social capital
 Social support
 Systems thinking

Notes

References
 Bronfenbrenner, U. (1979). "The ecology of human development: Experiments by nature and design." Cambridge, MA: Harvard University Press.
 Dalton, J.H., Elias, M.J., & Wandersman, A. (2001). "Community Psychology: Linking Individuals and Communities." Stamford, CT: Wadsworth.
 Chavis, D.M., & Wandersman, A. (1990). Sense of community in the urban environment: A catalyst for participation and community development. American Journal of Community Psychology, 18(1), 55–81.
 Kelly, J.G. (1966). Ecological constraints on mental health services. American Psychologist, 21, 535–539.
 Levine, M., Perkins, D. D., & Perkins, D. V. (2005). Principles of community psychology: Perspectives and applications (3rd ed.). New York: Oxford University Press.
 McMillan, D.W., & Chavis, D.M. (1986). Sense of community: A definition and theory. American Journal of Community Psychology, 14(1), 6–23.
Moritsugu, J. (2009). Community Psychology (4th ed.). Allyn & Bacon, Inc.
 Rappaport, J. (1977). "Community Psychology: Values, Research, & Action." New York: Holt, Rinehart & Winston.
 Rappaport, J. (1984). Studies in empowerment: Introduction to the issue. "Prevention in human Services," 3, 1–7.
 Riger, S. (1993). What's wrong with empowerment? "American Journal of Community Psychology," 21(3), 279–292.
 Sarason, S.B. (1974). The psychological sense of community: Prospects for a community psychology. San Francisco: Jossey-Bass.
 Trickett, E.J. (1984). Towards a Distinctive Community Psychology: An Ecological metaphor for Training and the Conduct of Research. American Journal of Community Psychology, 12, 261–279.
 Watzlawick, P., Weakland, J., & Fisch, R. (1974). "Change: Principles of problem formation and problem resolution." New York: Norton.
 Zimmerman, M.A. (2000). Empowerment Theory: Psychological, Organizational and Community Levels of Analysis. "Handbook of Community Psychology", 43–63.

External links
 Communitypsychology.com
 The Society for Community Research and Action – Division 27 of APA.]
 BPS Community Psychology Section
 "Educational Resources in Community Psychology (Teaching Resources and Lists of Graduate Programs) from SCRA – Division 27"
 "What is Community Psychology?"
 Community Psychology and Psychology in the Real World 
 "What is Community Psychology? – Spanish"
 The Need for Community Psychologists
 "Community Psychology Degree Overview from Idealist.org"
 Psychology & Action: Community Psychology – An introduction to community psychology on YouTube]
 "A Value Framework for Community Psychology" by Erika Sanborne, University of Massachusetts Lowell
 "Creating and Sharing Critical Community Psychology Curriculum for the 21st Century: An Invitation" Peer reviewed article in the Global Journal of Community Psychology and Practice
 "What is Community Psychology? An Interactive Video Explainer"

Community
Applied psychology